Jeon Jong-seo (born July 5, 1994), also known as Rachel Jun, is a South Korean actress. She rose to fame with the role of Hae-mi in the 2018 acclaimed South Korean thriller Burning, and has won Best Actress at the 57th Baeksang Arts Awards for her performance in the thriller The Call (2020). Internationally, she is best known for her role as Tokyo in Money Heist: Korea – Joint Economic Area (2022).

Early life
Jeon Jong-seo was born in Seoul, the only child in the family. Jeon and her family moved to Canada when she was a child. She attended a middle school in Canada, then returned to Korea and graduated from Anyang Arts High School. After high school, she attended Sejong University majoring in film. Later, she unenrolled from university to pursue her acting career more freely.

Career
Jeon Jong-seo started her acting career after she joined a management agency and attended her first audition in August 2017, for director Lee Chang-dong's mystery flick Burning. An inexperienced actor without any history in the entertainment industry, Jeon won the competition and landed the lead role at her very first audition, to play alongside recognized actors like Yoo Ah-in and Steven Yeun.

Jeon initially did not seek the role of free-spirited Hae-mi in Burning because she thought she had no chance of getting it. The audition took place only three days after she joined her current talent agency. Director Lee Chang-dong said about her audition, "When I saw her, she seemed to have this very childlike sense of innocence, but at the same time, she carried this sense of duality — as if something much bigger was on the other side of that innocence. So I thought she would be great to give Hae-mi the presence that is so central for the film — conveying that inner depth that this character has." And, "Perhaps I was unconsciously drawn to the fact that everything was a 'first time' for her. Also, she has a face that makes people wonder what she's feeling and thinking. I think that made her a good fit for Haemi's character." Lee also said that although the dance scene was in the screenplay, the dance movements were not planned or being rehearsed, but rather Jeon's spontaneous movements. Burning premiered at the Cannes Film Festival in May 2018, where Jeon walked the red carpet. The film received universal acclaim, competing for the Palme d'Or at the 2018 Cannes Film Festival, and became the first Korean film to make it to the final nine-film shortlist of Best Foreign Language Film at the 91st Academy Awards.

For her first role in the film, Jeon received international critical acclaim, including Best New Performer winner at the 2019 Asian Film Critics Association Awards, and being selected for The Hollywood Reporter Critics' "15 International Breakout Talents of 2018" feature. Pierce Conran of Screen Anarchy wrote, "Plucked from auditions, first-timer Jeon Jong-seo achieves something almost unthinkable for a rookie, as she embodies a character who is caught between her dreams and reality, her yearning for freedom and role in society, and the powerful desires of those around her and her own. She is magnetic every time she appears on screen, at once playful and aching with a longing for something that she may never understand." John Powers of Vogue wrote, "[i]n a marvelous screen debut, she gives a radiant turn, blooming so brightly—especially in a stoned twilight dance to Miles Davis—that she often outshines her male costars. Whenever she's not on-screen, the film instantly grows darker, unhappier." Justin Chang of Los Angeles Times wrote, "Jeon, making a remarkable screen debut, brings this young woman to beautiful, soulful and defiant life."

In 2020, Jeon starred in her second film, The Call. She plays Young-sook, who believes that the telephone connected to the future is the only hope to save herself from making dangerous choices. The film premiered on Netflix in November 2020. Jeon's antagonist performance was acclaimed. Anthony Kao of Cinemaescapist called it "an outstanding performance" and wrote, "Jeon’s acting gives The Call a constant current of electrifying suspense that lasts even into its post-credit scenes." James Marsh of South China Morning Post wrote, "Jun cements her position as Korean cinema’s unhinged ingénue du jour, following her star-making turn in Lee Chang-dong’s Burning, with a brilliantly psychotic performance that reveals Young-sook to be just as dangerous as she is fragile and damaged." Decider'''s Jade Budowski wrote, "Jong-seo Jun is magnificent as Young-sook [...] She’s convincing in both her quieter moments and her more maniacal outbursts, masterfully drawing out all the thrills and chills you could hope for with a movie of this nature". For her performance in The Call, Jeon won Best Actress in the 57th Baeksang Arts Awards, and Best Actress awards in the 30th Buil Film Awards and 20th Director's Cut Awards respectively.

The following year, Jeon joined United Talent Agency as her representative agency in the U.S., using her English name Rachel Jun. She made her English-language film debut alongside Kate Hudson and Craig Robinson in Mona Lisa and the Blood Moon, a fantasy-adventure film by Iranian-American writer-director Ana Lily Amirpour, as the lead character Mona. The film had its premiere at the 78th Venice International Film Festival in September 2021. Jeon's performance, as a woman who has unusual powers escaping from a mental asylum and tries to make it on her own in New Orleans, received positive reviews. Lovia Gyarkye from The Hollywood Reporter wrote, "Jeon (Burning) excels in her first English-language role, imbuing Mona with personality despite her limited dialogue". Variety's Owen Gleiberman wrote, "[i]n Jeon Jong-seo’s performance as Mona Lisa, you see the power and the alienation. And the two qualities work together in a cool and empathetic way". She next played a late 20s single woman who vows off relationships in a romantic comedy film Nothing Serious alongside Son Suk-ku, directed by Jeong Ga-young of Hit the Night. 

Jeon will star in her first series in Money Heist: Korea – Joint Economic Area, the Korean adaptation of the Spanish crime-drama Money Heist, as Tokyo. It will be released on Netflix in 2022. She will reunite with The Call director Lee Chung-hyun for his short film Ransom alongside Jin Seon-kyu, and for his Netflix film Ballerina, in which she portrays a former bodyguard. 

On August 22, 2022, Jeon signed an exclusive contract with Andmarq.

 Personal life 
Jeon Jong-seo has been in a relationship with  The Call'' director Lee Chung-hyun since December 2021.

Filmography

Film

Television series

Web series

Awards and nominations

References

External links

 Jeon Jong-seo at My Company
 
 
 

1994 births
Living people
21st-century South Korean actresses
South Korean film actresses
South Korean web series actresses
Sejong University alumni
Best Actress Paeksang Arts Award (film) winners